Bernard Philippe (born 4 October 1936) is a Luxembourgian wrestler. He competed in the men's Greco-Roman welterweight at the 1960 Summer Olympics.

References

1936 births
Living people
Luxembourgian male sport wrestlers
Olympic wrestlers of Luxembourg
Wrestlers at the 1960 Summer Olympics
Sportspeople from Luxembourg City